Cyriaque Simbizi (died 6 April 1994) was a Burundian Minister of Communication who was assassinated in a plane shootdown.

Early life 
Cyriaque Simbizi originated from Cankuzo Province, Burundi. Ethnically, he was Tutsi.

Political career 
Simbizi was originally a member of the Union pour le Progrès national (UPRONA), but switched his party affiliation to the Front pour la Démocratie au Burundi (FRODEBU) on 2 January 1994.

Death 

On 6 April 1994 Burundian President Cyprien Ntaryamira attended a regional summit in Dar es Salaam. Once the summit was over, Ntaryamira reportedly asked Rwandan President Juvénal Habyarimana if he could be taken home aboard the Rwandan Dassault Falcon 50 presidential jet, which was faster than his own propeller-driven plane. Habyarimana agreed and allowed Ntaryamira to accompany him along with two of his ministers, Simbizi and Bernard Ciza. At 8:23 PM as the jet was approaching Kigali International Airport, two surface-to-air rockets were fired, with the second missile striking it. The plane crashed, killing all aboard. Simbizi was buried in Bujumbura in a state funeral on 16 April alongside Ntaryamira and Ciza.

References

Works cited 
 
 
 

Burundian politicians
Tutsi people
Communications ministers of Burundi
1994 deaths
Victims of aviation accidents or incidents in Africa
People murdered in Rwanda
Victims of aircraft shootdowns
1990s murders in Rwanda
1994 crimes in Rwanda
1994 murders in Africa
Year of birth missing
Front for Democracy in Burundi politicians
Union for National Progress politicians
Burundian people murdered abroad